Science fiction will sometimes address the topic of religion. Often religious themes are used to convey a broader message, but others confront the subject head-on—contemplating, for example, how attitudes towards faith might shift in the wake of ever-advancing technological progress, or offering creative scientific explanations for the apparently mystical events related in religious texts (gods as aliens, prophets as time travelers, etc.). As an exploratory medium, science fiction rarely takes religion at face value by simply accepting or rejecting it; when religious themes are presented, they tend to be investigated deeply.

Some science fiction works portray invented religions, either placed into a contemporary Earth society (such as the Earthseed religion in Octavia Butler's Parable of the Sower), or in the far future (as seen in Dune by Frank Herbert, with its Orange Catholic Bible). Other works examine the role of existing religions in a futuristic or alternate society. The classic A Canticle for Leibowitz explores a world in which Catholicism is one of the few institutions to survive an apocalypse, and chronicles its slow re-achievement of prominence as civilisation returns.

Christian science fiction also exists, sometimes written as allegory for inspirational purposes.

Orson Scott Card has criticized the genre for oversimplifying religion, which he claims is always shown as "ridiculous and false".

Afterlife

 The Palace of Eternity (1969) by Bob Shaw
 The Riverworld series, by Philip José Farmer
 Ubik (1969) by Philip K. Dick — In the novel, companies use a form of cryonic suspension ("cold-pac chambers") to preserve the deceased in a state of "half-life" which allows for limited consciousness and the ability to communicate with both the living world and others in half-life. (The half-life concept was first explored in Dick's novella, "What the Dead Men Say" (1964))
 The Divine Invasion (1981) by Philip K. Dick — Dick revisits cryonic suspension in this novel, with two principal differences being that, here, (A) the clinically dead can be brought back to life with proper medical procedures (provided they do not lose brain function for too long a period before being suspended) and (B) the dreamlike state of one in cryonic suspension often takes the form of extended memories from the person's life. The Divine Invasion also explores more traditionally religious visions of afterlife; e.g., deities discuss a sifting bridge that must be crossed by the souls of the newly dead to be judged and the coming-about of an "Advocate" who speaks on behalf of those souls so that they need not be "plunged into the fiery pit of hell" (pp. 134–138).

Angels

 In Out of the Silent Planet (1938; part of the Space Trilogy), by C. S. Lewis, the protagonist meets "eldila", mysterious beings of light native to the void of interplanetary space (who are actually what Christianity defines as "angels", and who are also identified as Mars, Venus and other deities of Greek and Roman mythology), and are completely loyal and obedient to God, and have never wanted to be worshiped as gods themselves (although the ancient Greeks and Romans mistakenly did so)

Creation myths

 The film Prometheus (2012) explores the myth that human life did not arise spontaneously by chance, but that a humanoid species, the "Engineers", created life on Earth. They also taught humans how to use technology and visited the Earth sporadically.  Some elements are similar to the ancient astronaut myths.  The story develops when a scientific expedition travels to confront their creators.
 In the film Blade Runner (1982) based on Philip K. Dick's novel Do Androids Dream of Electric Sheep?, Roy Batty is an artificial person looking to confront his creator, while Rick Deckard searches for lost humanity despite his job: hunting and "retiring" runaway replicants.
 Mary Shelley's Frankenstein
 The short story The Last Question (1956) by Isaac Asimov – Humans of the future ask the supercomputer Multivac how the net amount of entropy of the universe can be massively decreased. Multivac fails, displaying the error message "INSUFFICIENT DATA FOR MEANINGFUL ANSWER". The story continues through many iterations of computer technology, each more powerful and ethereal than the last. Each of these computers is asked the question, and each returns the same response until finally the universe dies with the exception of Cosmic AC – Multivac's final successor. At that point it has collected all the data it can, and so poses the question to itself. As the universe died, Multivac drew all of humanity into hyperspace, to preserve them until it could finally answer the Last Question. Ultimately, Multivac did decipher the answer, announcing "Let there be light!".
 The early part of Tolkien's The Silmarillion provides a detailed creation myth, with the world being created through the singing of Angel-like beings under the direction of God. Similar to the Christian account of The War in Heaven, this myth includes the rebellion of Melkor (equivalent of Lucifer/Satan) but considerably different in detail from the Christian account.

Demons

 In the Doom series demons from Hell have come into the universe through an inter-dimensional portal which is located on Mars.
 In Princess of Wands by John Ringo, a Christian housewife and soccer mom gets involved in an organization which co-operates with the FBI in dealing with demons.
 In That Hideous Strength by C. S. Lewis, the villains of the story are guided by beings they call "macrobes" which are clearly meant to be demons.
 In Warhammer 40,000 series, some of the villains of the story appear to be demons, beings of immense power and strength. They can be summoned by certain groups of people with arcane knowledge. They are known as daemons, and the people who hunt them, daemon hunters.

Devil

 The television series Futurama features a recurring character called the Robot Devil.
 In the 1975 Doctor Who episode "Pyramids of Mars", the Doctor states that Satan is one of the names the last of the Osirians, Sutekh (who considers all life his enemy), is known by.
 In the 1978 television series Battlestar Galactica, the two-part episode "War of the Gods" features a character very much like the Devil who is portrayed by Patrick Macnee. His name is Count Iblis — Iblis being the Islamic name of the Devil.
 The 2006 Doctor Who episodes "The Impossible Planet" and "The Satan Pit" feature an ancient being known as the Beast, which claims to be the basis of the Devil figure in all religions and mythologies; earlier in "The Dæmons", it is shown a race resembling the typical image of the Devil had visited Earth and become the basis for both Gods and Demons.
 In Perelandra by C. S. Lewis, the protagonist must fight against a man possessed by a demon, hinted to be the devil himself.
 Ubik (1969) by Philip K. Dick — In the novel, companies uses a form of cryonic suspension to preserve the deceased in a state of "half-life" which allows for limited consciousness and the ability to communicate.  The recently deceased protagonist Joe Chip finds the "reality" of the half-life world around him decaying and temporally regressing and discovers that Jory Miller, another half-lifer, is the cause of this; Jory devours the life force of others in half-life in order to prolong his own existence. Ella, who has been in "half-life" for many years, instructs Joe Chip on the usage of the spray "Ubik" (whose name is derived from the Latin word ubique meaning "everywhere") which can preserve people in half-life from Jory's deleterious influence. While Ubik can be seen as a metaphor for God, Jory Miller can be seen as an allegorical representation of the Devil.
 The Divine Invasion (1981) by Philip K. Dick — In this second installment of the VALIS trilogy, Belial (also referred to as Satan, the Adversary, and the bright morning star who "Fell from heaven and began it all (p. 80)) is depicted as a little, foul-smelling goat kid who is accidentally released from his cage (p. 221). Satan is described as the "prosecutor of man in the divine court" who "impugns and indicts" souls, a role contrasted with "the Advocate who defends the accused human" (pp. 137–138). Belial is also presented as protagonist Herb Asher's yetzer ha-ra, whom Herb must not choose over his yetzer ha-tov (p. 253).
 In the episode "Something Ricked This Way Comes" (2014) of the science fiction comedy television series Rick and Morty, a character "Summer" reports to her first job in an antique shop run by the Devil that sells items that fulfill a desire for the owner but come at a price making the item essentially worthless (the shop and the Devil's name, Mr. Needful, are both references and parodies of the Stephen King novel Needful Things). During the episode, a protagonist "Rick" sets up a competitive counter-business across the street that removes the curses and runs the Devil out of business. The Devil is so dismayed that he tries to kill himself but Summer finds himself in the middle of his suicide attempt and revives him. They relaunch with a new dot-com company that becomes wildly successful. As it turns out, the Devil had no plans to include Summer in reaping the profits and has her hauled off by security. Betrayed by the Devil, she and Rick build muscle mass to get physical revenge.
 In an episode of Star Trek: The Animated Series called "The Magicks of Megas-tu", the Devil is captured by space-faring Puritans and is to be destroyed. Kirk argues in his defense.
 In an episode of Star Trek: The Next Generation called "Devil's Due", a character named Ardra is an alien that uses technology to appropriate the religious myths of several planets. She takes the holographic form of several "devils", to extort goods and services from a terrified populace.

Eschatology and the ultimate fate of the universe

 In the far future of Le Dernier Homme (1805) by Jean-Baptiste Cousin de Grainville Earth is becoming sterile and the human ability to reproduce is failing. A man travels to the last fertile woman to begin a rebirth of the human race and at return meets Adam, the first man, who has been condemned by God to watch all the damned among his descendants enter Hell, and is now charged with persuading the pair not to prolong the life of humanity, which God has determined must now end. The world then begins to end the dead to rise from their graves while Ormus, the spirit of Earth, who cannot survive without humanity, despairs.
 Omega: The Last Days of the World (1894) by Camille Flammarion
 The poem Darkness (1816) by Lord Byron
 Star Maker (1937) by Olaf Stapledon
 The Nine Billion Names of God (1953) by Arthur C. Clarke
 The Last Question (1956) by Isaac Asimov (see #Creation myths)
 City at the End of Time (2008) by Greg Bear
 That Extraordinary Day (2012) by Predrag Vukadinović
 At the end of Tau Zero (1970) by Poul Anderson, the universe collapses in a Big Crunch and then explodes in a new Big Bang. However, the starship with the book's protagonists on board survives because there is still enough uncondensed hydrogen for maneuvering, outside the monobloc, and eventually they could colonize one of the new universe's planets.
 Manifold: Time (1999) by Stephen Baxter begins at the end of space and time, when the last descendants of humanity face an infinite but pointless existence. Due to proton decay the physical universe has collapsed, but some form of intelligence has survived by embedding itself into a lossless computing substrate where it can theoretically survive indefinitely.  However, because there will never be new input, eventually all possible thoughts will be exhausted. Some portion of this intelligence decides that this should not have been the ultimate fate of the universe, and takes action to change the past, centering around the early 21st century.
 Left Behind is a series of 16 best-selling novels by Tim LaHaye and Jerry B. Jenkins, dealing with Christian dispensationalist End Times: the pretribulation, premillennial, Christian eschatological viewpoint of the end of the world. The primary conflict of the series is the members of the Tribulation Force against the Global Community and its leader Nicolae Carpathia—the Antichrist. Left Behind is also the title of the first book in the series. The series was first published 1995–2007 by Tyndale House, a firm with a history of interest in dispensationalism.

Evangelism

 In S. M. Stirling's Nantucket series, the entire island of Nantucket is suddenly transported into the past, to about 1300 BC and the modern Americans marooned in the past must make the best of the Bronze Age world in which they find themselves; the Christians among them face the dilemma of whether or not to embark on missionary activity and spread their religion – even though Jesus Christ had not yet been born, and the very act of their spreading Christianity might so fundamentally change the world that Jesus might never be born at all.
 In The Sparrow by Mary Doria Russell, most of the Jesuit missionaries sent to investigate a radio transmission from an unknown planet (believing that they have been chosen by God to be the first to set foot on an alien world) are killed by the planet's inhabitants; and the sole survivor is enslaved but eventually escapes and returns to Earth with his faith in tatters.
 In the short story "The Word to Space" by Poul Anderson, alien religious broadcasts were deliberately beamed to humanity.

Fictional religions

 A main theme of Philip K. Dick's novel Do Androids Dream of Electric Sheep? (1968) is the fictional religion "Mercerism". It is Earth's main religion, in which Empathy Boxes link simultaneous users into a collective consciousness based on the suffering of Wilbur Mercer. In the shared experience of the Empathy Box, Wilbur Mercer takes an endless walk up a mountain while stones are thrown at him, the pain of which all users share. Television broadcasts of "Buster Friendly" represent a second religion, designed to undermine Mercerism.
 The Earthseed religion in Octavia Butler's Parable of the Sower
 The Bajoran religion – Star Trek: Deep Space Nine
 Cavism in Gore Vidal's novel Messiah – a religion founded by John Cave, an American undertaker. Cave teaches, among other things, not to fear death and to actually desire it under certain circumstances. Later followers come to glorify death, and even enforce it on other members. The founder John Cave is himself ironically killed by his followers when he proves inconvenient for the new religion's development. Cavism eventually completely displaces and destroys Christianity, even to the extent of all Gothic Cathedrals being blown up and destroyed to erase all trace of it.
 The Klingon religion and various other religions from Star Trek
 Bene Gesserit, Buddislam, Maometh Saari, Mahayana Christianity, Zensunni Catholicism in Frank Herbert's Dune series
 Bokononism in Cat's Cradle by Kurt Vonnegut
 Chernobog, the Satanic, cannibalistic, human-sacrificing god whose worship displaced Christianity in the remnants of Russia in the post-apocalyptic world of The Peshawar Lancers by S. M. Stirling.
 Church of All Worlds (inspired a non-fictional religious group of the same name) and other religions from Stranger in a Strange Land by Robert A. Heinlein
 Church of the Second Chance in Philip José Farmer's Riverworld series.
 Cylon monotheistic religion – Battlestar Galactica
 Divine Order of His Shadow – Lexx TV series
 Robotology, Robot Judaism, The First Amalgamated Church and other religions from the animated television program Futurama
 Foundationism – Babylon 5
 Fordism – Brave New World
 The various religions (Sith, Jedi) of Star Wars
 Gorgolorism – in The Goblin Tower by L. Sprague de Camp, the city state of Tarxia is a theocracy dominated by the priesthood of the frog god Gorgolor, who is considered the One True God. In other places, Gorgolor is just a minor god in a larger Pantheon. However, saying that in Tarxia might result in being burned as a heretic.
 Goa'uld religion – most Goa'uld pose as gods to control slave armies. "Goa'uld" means "God" in the Goa'uld language from the television series Stargate SG-1
 Hemilkism in The Gate of Time by Philip José Farmer - in an alternate history where there never was a Roman Empire and European culture has many Semitic elements, a major religion was founded in the Fourteenth Century by a charismatic Irish religious figure named Hemilka. While having some resemblances to Christianity, Hemilkism is not an imperialist faith and therefore does not dominate its world in the way Christianity does in ours.
 Monism (specifically, Evangelical Monism) in Robert Heinlein's Tunnel in the Sky. In the last decades of the 21st Century, great waves of Monist proselyting swept out of Persia and numerous Westerners were converted. Two generations later, when the plot takes place, Evangelical Monism is one of the main religious denominations in the US, many American families observing the Monist ritual of lighting the Lamp of Peace during dinner. From references in the book, the Monist faith appears to be Deistic, with a generalized acceptance of a deity having no particular defining characteristics or abilities, and including significant elements of Fire worship – suggesting the influence Mazdaism, the pre-Islamic fire-worshiping religion of Persia. For such a religion to be strongly established in modern Persia/Iran implies a major upheaval in the position of Islam there – for which Heinlein provides no information . 
 Ori religion - the main antagonist in Stargate SG-1 after the fall of the Goa'uld. Ori, ascended beings, relatives and mortal enemies of the Ancients, thrive on the life force stolen from their worshippers. The clash is finally resolved in the movie Stargate: The Ark of Truth.
 Church of Science – the bogus religion established by Salvor Hardin in Isaac Asimov's Foundation
 Soterism - in the alternate history of L. Sprague de Camp's Aristotle and the Gun, Christianity never arose. Its place during the Roman Empire was taken by Soterism, an Egypto-Hellenic synthesis founded by a fiery Egyptian prophet, whose followers called him "Soter" – the Greek word for "Savior". Soterism did not become as powerful as  Christianity in the history we know, with Mitraism and Odinism surviving at its side. In later times, followers of these religions hounded the scientist Georg Schwartzhorn (much as Galileo was persecuted in our history).   
 Church of Humanity Unchained - the primary religion of the Grayson and Masada systems in David Weber's the Honorverse. (Two churches, with one origin, but now mutually implacably hostile, with massively different theologies.)
 In John Varley's story "Equinoctial", the Rings of Saturn are inhabited by the followers of two mutually antagonistic religions. The Church of Cosmic Engineering (informally The Engineers), founded by Ringpainter the Great, considers it a Sacred Duty to paint red the Rings of Saturn - a duty holy enough to be worth the devoting of one's entire lifetime to it. The opposing Conservationist Church (Consers in short) is equally certain that painting the Rings is the Ultimate Sacrilege and that undoing all such painting is the task to which one should devote one's life. The two are involved in a centuries-long, fierce religious war - both equally certain that the issue of painting or unpainting the Rings fully justifies killing on sight any member of the opposing Church (see Eight Worlds#Symbiotic spacesuits).
In Fallout there is a religious, cult-like group known as The Children of Atom. They worship a god-like entity known as Atom and believe in an afterlife of sorts, which is known as the great beyond. The group is known for worshipping nuclear weapons. They set up churches in radioactive areas to stay closer to Atom.
 Cthulhu Mythos deities
 In The Magic Labyrinth, the fifth volume of Philip Jose Farmer's Riverworld series, humans from different times and places who were resurrected on the banks of a great river in another world found the pacifist Church of the Second Chance, offering resurrected people a second chance to live a more moral life than their earlier one. Both Hermann Göring and Erik Bloodaxe take this chance in all sincerity, becoming adherents of the pacifist Church.
 The Eclesiarchy- the state sanctioned church worshipping the Emperor of mankind, which is ironic as he denounced all religions and stated as a fact that he wasn't a God. And as a further ironic twist the Eclesiarchy had based itself off of the Lectitio Devinatatus, a book written by his son Lorgar who later denounced his father, threw in with the Chaos gods and became a Daemon prince of sorts.
 Dinosaur religions in the Chicxulub Asteroid Missed Stories by Harry Turtledove, featuring several races of intelligent dinosaurs. The technologically advanced Greenskins believe in a pantheon of gods with some variants. The World Egg theology holds that the gods cracked open a large egg and built the world from its contents. The Down from the Sky or Out of the Sky theology believes that the gods deposited people from the sky in the Beginning. The theory of evolution, however, is beginning to challenge Greenskin theology. The Brownskins, whose territory is being aggressively colonized by the Greenskins, have their own pantheon of gods who are depicted in giant statues on a Mountain. They believe that the gods Shingto, Fferso, Incol, and Oosev created them, and that other gods or demons created the Greenskins.

God or deities

 In "2112", the inhabitants of the planets of the Solar Federation venerate Greek nymph Syrinx.
 Absolution Gap by Alastair Reynolds
 In the film Avatar (2009), the Na'vi, an alien race, worship a goddess named Eywa
 In For I Am a Jealous People, by Lester del Rey, Jehovah abandons humanity and sponsors an alien race in an invasion of Earth
 The video game Homeworld features a single god called Sajuuk
 In Lord of Light, by Roger Zelazny, a nobleman re-creates a rival religious movement to dethrone a false pantheon of Hindu-inspired "Gods" on a world where magic and science coexist
 The Man Who Was Thursday,  by G. K. Chesterton
 Neverness, by David Zindell
 Parable of the Sower, by Octavia E. Butler, features a religion called Earthseed, where "God is change".
 In the television series Stargate SG-1, and the 1994 Stargate film, the supposed ancient gods are revealed to be powerful, parasitic aliens posing as supernatural beings to exploit mankind. Stargate SG-1 later introduces the Ancients and the Ori, who are basically indistinguishable from actual gods - particularly the Ori who command worship and actually gain power by it.
 In the Star Trek: The Next Generation episode "Who Watches the Watchers", a serious accident with a hidden scientific observation post starts a chain of events that leads to a primitive civilization becoming convinced that the Starfleet personnel are divine beings with Captain Jean-Luc Picard being the supreme one; and the crew of the Enterprise struggle to prevent the reestablishment of religion in the civilization.
 In the Star Trek: The Original Series episode "Who Mourns for Adonais?", the Enterprise crew encounters an alien figure who is the ancient Greek god, Apollo.
 In Philip K. Dick's novel, VALIS, the protagonist faces an all-powerful God who subtly manipulates the actions and thoughts of humans in an effort to redeem humanity.
 Ubik (1969) by Philip K. Dick — After dying and being placed into a form of cryonic suspension called "half-life," protagonist Joe Chip and his colleagues find the "reality" of the half-life world around them decaying and temporally regressing; one-by-one, Joe Chip's colleagues are shrivelling up and their consciousnesses are dying.  Ubik, a spray product whose name is derived from the Latin word ubique meaning "everywhere", can preserve people in half-life from this regression.  Dick's former wife Tessa remarked that "Ubik is a metaphor for God.  Ubik is all-powerful and all-knowing, and Ubik is everywhere.  The spray can is only a form that Ubik takes to make it easy for people to understand it and use it".  The metaphor is also made clear in a passage of the book.
 The protagonist of The Worthing Saga, by Orson Scott Card, keeps himself in hidden stasis over the years, and becomes the target of worship by the descendants of the very settlers that he delivered to a new world
 James K. Morrow's Godhead trilogy considers the literal death of God, when the two-mile-long corpse of God is found floating at sea. In the first volume, Towing Jehovah (Harcourt Brace, 1994) the angel Raphael calls on supertanker captain Anthony Van Horne to tow the body to an icy tomb in the north, while the faithful and unbelieving alike seek to deal with the fallout of the death of God.
 In the short story The Last Question (1956) by Isaac Asimov humans of the future ask the supercomputer Multivac how the net amount of entropy of the universe can be massively decreased. Multivac fails, displaying the error message "INSUFFICIENT DATA FOR MEANINGFUL ANSWER". The story continues through many iterations of computer technology, each more powerful and ethereal than the last. Each of these computers is asked the question, and each returns the same response until finally the universe dies with the exception of Cosmic AC – Multivac's final successor. At that point it has collected all the data it can, and so poses the question to itself. As the universe died, Multivac drew all of humanity into hyperspace, to preserve them until it could finally answer the Last Question. Ultimately, Multivac did decipher the answer, announcing "Let there be light!" and essentially ascending to the state of God in the Old Testament.
 In Sara Paretsky's novel Ghost Country, an ancient Mesopotamian fertility goddess calling herself Starr appears in present-day Chicago. She exudes an overwhelming sexuality, affecting both men and women, and attracts an enormous crowd of worshipers, especially from among Chicago's poor and homeless. To the chagrin and scandal of Protestant and Catholic clergy alike, she emulates many of the miracles of Jesus Christ - feeding many people with minute amounts of food, healing the sick and also bringing the dead back to life. Finally she is lynched by a mob of bigoted Christians inside one of the city's most prestigious churches – but her body unaccountably disappears from the morgue three days later, though no one actually saw her rise. Thus disappearing, she has had an enormous – and on whole, positive – impact on the lives of all the book's cast of characters.
 In the universal roleplaying setting Nova Praxis, a supercomputer with the ability to process theoretical environments encompassing all laws of physics, was created. It started inventing all kinds of obscure technology and jumped human technology and civilization forwards by over a millennium, before suddenly shutting down after 3 months of work, likely due to system overload. The computer, called Mimir (pronounced "me-mer"), is considered by some to be a deity, prophesied to return to gift humanity with the ultimate ascension, and the virtual-reality library that contains all the data produced by "her", called "The black library" due to its black-and-white design, is considered a holy place of pilgrimage.

Heaven and paradise

 "The Reformers" (Weird Science #20) — When three space men dressed in scifi versions of religious garb land on a planet to "free it of evil;" they are greeted by a man named Peter who informs them they are not needed (for there is no crime, no immorality, nor any of the evils seen in other societies); so they plan to create evil for which they can blame literature, clothing, and alcohol (as they have done on previous worlds)—including Earth—they are contracted by their leader (the Devil) who informs that their efforts are doomed...because they have landed in Heaven.
 In an alternate scene of Prometheus (2012) astronaut Elizabeth Shaw who survived the clash with god-like aliens who turned out to be rather malicious asks the AI David to navigate a stranded alien spaceship toward where the alien came from instead of back to Earth, saying "I don't want to go back to where we came from...I want to go where they came from...I want to go to paradise." Previously Shaw has been portrayed as a deeply religious person whose first encounter with the concept of heaven or paradise stems from when her mother died – a memory David coexperienced during Shaw's hypersleep. Previously an additional dialogue between Shaw and David was shown:
Elizabeth Shaw: Before that thing ripped your head off, what did he say, David?
David (AI): "Thing;" Dr. Shaw? Not too long ago, you considered them gods.
Elizabeth Shaw: God never tried to kill me. So... what did he say? Where did he come from?
David: There is no direct translation, but... Several of your ancient cultures had a word similar to it... "Paradise".
When David asks her what she hopes to achieve by going there she tells him that she wants to know why the aliens (the "Engineers") created humanity and why they later intended to destroy them.

Hell

 In the cult science fiction/horror movie Event Horizon, the titular ship passes through an extra-dimensional realm, and the crew—possessed by an entity from Hell—are driven murderously insane.
 "A Nice Place to Visit", a 1960 episode of The Twilight Zone
 The short story "A Planet Named Shayol" (by Cordwainer Smith), was inspired by Dante's Inferno
 The Divine Invasion (1981) by Philip K. Dick — The novel states that "a sifting bridge had to be crossed by the newly dead person. If he was evil the bridge got narrower and narrower until he toppled off and plunged into the fiery pit of hell" (p. 134). Although this bridge was originally mechanical in its punishment of sinful souls, there one day came a new figure, the "Beside-Helper" or "Advocate," who would defend and speak for anyone who accepted his assistance before stepping upon the bridge (p. 135), thereby "feed[ing] mercy into the circuit" (p. 136).

Jesus

 H. G. Wells' A Modern Utopia, takes place in an alternate timeline in which "Jesus Christ had been born into a liberal and progressive Roman Empire that spread from the Arctic Ocean to the Bight of Benin, and was to know no Decline and Fall"  - with profound implications for Jesus' religious teachings, and later on those of Muhammad.
 In Behold the Man by Michael Moorcock, twentieth-century Karl Glogauer (a Jew obsessed with the figures of Jesus and Carl Jung), travels in time to the year 28 A.D. where he meets various New Testament figures (such as John the Baptist and the Virgin Mary), and discovers that Mary and Joseph's child, Jesus, is a mentally retarded hunchback, who could never become the Jesus as is portrayed in the Scriptures, and after having a mental breakdown, steps into the role of Jesus, eventually dying on the cross (having specifically asked Judas to betray him).
 In The Didymus Contingency, by Jeremy Robinson, a scientist's time-travel to see Jesus' death and resurrection—only to witness several scenes not recorded in the New Testament (while realizing Jesus was a fraud)—faces the dilemma of whether or not to make a revelation in the present which would shake the foundations of Christianity is complicated further with the appearance of an assassin from a different future
 The Last Starship from Earth, by John Boyd, is set in a dystopian society in the very near future (in an alternate timeline) where Jesus Christ became a revolutionary agitator and was never subjected to crucifixion; and who overthrew the Roman Empire by force of arms, and established a theocracy that has lasted until the twentieth century
 In Garry Kilworth's story Let's Go to Golgotha!, tourists from the future can book a time-traveling "Crucifixion Tour", but before setting out, they are strictly told that, when the crowd is asked whether Jesus or Barabbas should be spared, they must all join the call: "Give us Barabbas!"—however, when the moment comes, the protagonist suddenly realizes that the crowd condemning Jesus to the cross is composed entirely of tourists from the future, and that no actual Jewish Israelites of 33 A.D. are present at all
 When the protagonists of Clifford Simak's Mastodonia make trips to the past commercially available, American church groups band together and seek to purchase an exclusive franchise for Jesus' time on Earth—not because they want to go there but because they do not want anyone at all to go there (the clergymen state quite forthrightly their apprehension that time travel would disprove some of the accounts given in the Gospels and thus undermine Christianity)—when refused, the church groups turn aggressive and energetically lobby Congress to ban time travel altogether; opening an enormous theological debate unresolved by the end of the book
 Ray Bradbury's 1949 story "The Man". reprinted in The Illustrated Man, tells of a miracle worker who matches the description of Jesus and who travels from planet to planet, healing and teaching. When a spaceship lands on one such planet and is told that the miracle worker had been there just the day before, the arrogant captain vows to chase him down through space until he catches him. After the captain blasts off again in search of the man, another spaceman, who chose to remain behind because of his faith having been awakened by the faith of the people on that planet, is told that the man is still there.
 In The Rescuer, by Arthur Porges, future scientists destroy a three-billion dollar time-travel project because a religious fanatic had taken over the machine, heading for Golgotha with a rifle and five thousand rounds in an attempt to save Jesus and the affair must be kept from the public, since some might identify with "The Rescuer"
 Resurrection Day (1999) by Thomas Wyckoff, is about a man sent back into time to steal Jesus' body to disprove Christianity
 In There Will Be Time, by Poul Anderson, a young twentieth-century American (who has discovered that he has the ability to travel through time without any need of a machine) reasons that there must be others like him and that Jerusalem at the time of the crucifixion is a good place to try locating them, goes there and walks through the street singing the Greek mass (which is meaningless to people of the time), but get himself located by agents of a time-travel policing organization, who take him to their headquarters in the far future—without getting to see Jesus at all
 In the TimeWars series by Simon Hawke, set in 2461, Cardinal Lodovico Consorti proposes to use the recently discovered time-travel technology to obtain empirical proof that Christ indeed rose from the dead after being crucified, causing the Catholic Church to excommunicate him (the Church hierarchy preferring to continue relying on faith alone and not seeking factual confirmation)
 Times Without Number, by John Brunner, depicts an alternate reality in which the Spanish Armada had conquered England; and when time travel is discovered—controlled by the Catholic Church—it is decreed that every new pope would be privileged to travel to Palestine in the time of Christ's ministry, while everyone else is strictly forbidden to go there
 In The Traveller, by Richard Matheson, a confirmed skeptic is chosen to be the first to travel in time to see the crucifixion (in a kind of traveling cage which makes him invisible to the people of the past) and he witnesses the actual event, causing him to feel empathy for Jesus; and is hauled back to the present after attempting to save him; and, although he had seen no miracles, he is a changed man, having seen "a man giving up his life for the things he believed" and stating, "that should be miracle enough for everybody".
 The plot of Jesus Video, a German novel by Andreas Eschbach, revolves around the search for a hidden video camera that is believed to hold digital footage of Jesus recorded by a time traveler
 In Robert Silverberg's Up the Line, featuring a company organizing tours into the past, a character notes that "the crowd at the Sermon on the Mount grows bigger and bigger, every time I go there again"
 Robert Young wrote a short story called Time Travel, Inc where two men go back in time to meet Jesus through sending their minds into peoples' bodies who were alive at the time and get trapped in the bodies of the two crucified thieves. 
 In one of the episodes of Philip José Farmer's Riverworld series, Jesus was resurrected in a manner completely different from that depicted in Christian theology. Along with millions of other people from all times and places in history, he was given a new, completely human, life along the banks of a mysterious long river on another planet. In this depiction, the revived Jesus is a Jew who never intended to found a new religion, and when encountering Christians from later ages he does not recognize himself in the Divine Jesus which they believe in. He is delighted to encounter an Israelite woman who took part in The Exodus from Egypt and whose eye-witness account of Moses and Aharon is substantially different from that in the Bible. Eventually Jesus is tortured to death by a rabidly antisemitic Medieval German Baron, who angrily rejects the very idea that this Jew might be Jesus. Before dying again, Jesus cries out: "Father, they do know what they are doing!"
 In an episode of Star Trek: The Original Series called "Bread and Circuses", an alien planet is depicted as having "parallel evolution" to that of Earth and at the time of the episode was in a state of "20th century Rome." Slaves were forced to fight gladiator style on a television set designed like ancient Rome that was broadcast to the rest of the citizens. However, some of the slaves rebelled when they heard the "word of the sun" and became "sun worshipers." It is revealed at the end of the episode that the rebel slaves were not inspired by the "sun" but by the "son;" as in the Son of God. The last few line of the episode is delivered by Captain Kirk and Dr. McCoy where Kirk says "Caesar and Christ; they had them both. And the word is spreading only now" and McCoy says "a philosophy of total love and total brotherhood."
 As depicted in Mission by Patrick Tilley, when the body of Jesus disappeared from the tomb in Jerusalem, he did not ascend to Heaven; rather, Jesus' body was transported 6000 miles westwards and some 1900 years into the future, and at New York City in the Year of Our Lord 1981 a police car discovered this badly battered body lying at slum alleyway. Taken to a hospital, Jesus came back to life in the morgue. Out of the millions of New Yorkers, Jesus - who exhibited the ability to speak fluent American English - chose to confide in Leo Resnick, a hard-headed corporate lawyer with not the slightest vestige of religious or spiritual leanings. As he told Resnick, Jesus was in fact an extraterrestrial marooned on Earth by a malfunction in his spaceship's landing craft. Though he had some powers and abilities far beyond those of human beings, he was by no means Divine or omnipotent. Since the Earth's atmosphere was highly poisonous to him, his only chance of survival was to be "incubated" in the body of a human being. He chose for that purpose the body of Joshua, a Jewish native of Roman-ruled Judea. Joshua and the extraterrestrial "visitor" coexisted in an uneasy symbiosis inside the same body - hence the Two Natures of Jesus, an issue of crucial importance to Christian theology. From there, the book continues to describe Jesus' new career in 20th Century America and to provide much information about his earlier career which never got into the New Testament.
 A big part of the plot of An Instance of the Fingerpost by Iain Pears is simple historical fiction, laid in a  historically accurate background of 17th Century England. However, the book has a considerable fantasy element - based on the assumption that in every generation Jesus Christ is born again, and in each incarnation is doomed to be martyred again and then again come back to life, and soon disappear - to be reborn again in the next generation. In 17th Century England, Jesus is reincarnated as a woman, and the book depicts in detail her virtuous life, her being martyred (by very unpleasant Christians) and her miraculous coming back to life.

Another Son of God
 In the alternate history timeline of Harry Turtledove's In High Places, in which the Black Plague was much worse than in our history, there appeared in the city of Avignon at that time of crisis a charismatic religious leader named Henri, claiming to be "The Second Son of God". He was executed as a heretic. However, on the day after his execution, the church where the Pope and the King of France were worshiping collapsed, killing both of them. This was taken as an act of divine retribution and a proof of Henri's claim. Therefore, the worship of Henri as the Second Son of God was officially taken up by the Catholic Church. The life of Henri was described in "The Final Testament", added to the New Testament (with the name implying that the Church would not welcome any Third Son); churches were henceforward built with two towers, standing for Jesus and Henri; since Henri was broken on a wheel, the wheel became the symbol of Christianity instead of the cross; and Avignon remained the permanent seat of the papacy and became a holy city, with pilgrims flocking to the locations associated with Henri's life and martyrdom. In later times, Christians tended in times of crisis to call on Henri rather than on Jesus. This upheaval in Christian theology had the effect of deepening the hostility between Christianity and  Islam. The Muslims - grown very powerful due to the black plague devastating Europe - respected Jesus as a Prophet, but refused to accord any such status to Henri.
 The Stephen Baxter story "The Lingering Joy", a sequel to Poul Anderson's The Long Remembering,<ref>Published in Multiverse: Exploring Poul Anderson's Worlds, ed. Greg bear and Gardner Dozois, Subterranean Press, Boston, 2014</ref> depicts a world on the brink of destruction in nuclear war. A young woman, the story's protagonist, embarks on a kind of "mental time travel", enabling her to experience the life of a prehistoric ancestress. Her main motivation is religious: to find out whether the Incarnation of Jesus was a single and unique event, or if God had before incarnated among the Neanderthals, to bring salvation to them, too. She experiences the life of a remote ancestress, a rebellious young Cro-Magnon woman who seeks to prove that she can be the equal of her tribe's male hunters. But while in courage and skill she is fully their equal, she cannot match the male hunters' ruthless cruelty. When visiting the last remaining enclave of the Goblins (Neanderthals), on the verge of final extinction, she cannot help feeling empathy and compassion for a male Goblin whose mate was raped and murdered by a male of her own tribe. She then encounters the miraculous baby who was born to the doomed Goblins, his birth heralded by a strange new star which blazed in the sky, tens of thousands of years before the Star of Bethlehem.
 In the post-apocalyptic world depicted in Edgar Pangborn's novel Davy, the Holy Murkan Church – holding sway over a quasi-medieval culture which had grown in what had been the northeastern United States – preaches veneration of Abraham, a divine being who was incarnated in human form and underwent martyrdom at what had been Newburgh, New York and became the Holy City of Nuber. Under this new dispensation, Jesus Christ was downgraded to the status of an earlier prophet who prophesied the coming of Abraham.
 Kevin J. Anderson's Terra Incognita, fantasy series depicts two rival religions - similar though not identical to Christianity - who both believe that God had two sons, Aiden and Urec. Each Church worships one of these Sons of God, abhors the other one and regards the other Church's teaching as a blasphemous heresy. In the course of the series, the two Churches and their followers engage in an ever escalating series of atrocities, each believing itself an utterly innocent victim and regarding the other as the incarnation of evil, and both determined to possess at any price the Holy City of Insalem (reminiscent of Jerusalem). When both sides whip themselves into a truly genocidal fury, the conflict is resolved by a literal Deus Ex Machina. God the Father, in whom both profess to believe, makes a personal appearance at a bloody battlefield, accompanied by yet a third Son of God, and sternly warns everybody that unless they cease killing each other in his name, he would consider wiping out all of them and starting from scratch. Under this dire divine threat, the two contending Churches are forced to move from a fanatic murderous religious war straight into a highly enlightened ecumenism - merging their priesthoods, ceremonies and religious symbols and being provided with a brand-new Scripture to supersede their earlier contending holy books.

Daughter of God
 In James Morrow's novel Only Begotten Daughter, Julie Katz is the new Messiah, the daughter of God, spontaneously conceived from a sperm bank donation by her father, Murray Katz, through "inverse parthenogenesis". Julie struggles with her messianic powers, the mind games of Satan, being hunted by fundamentalists, and the silence of her mother, God. This novel precedes Morrow's Godhead Trilogy.
 In Poul Anderson's story The Longest Voyage, humans marooned on a faraway planet eventually create a society similar to Elizabethan England, except that their monotheistic religion is focused on veneration of a Daughter of God rather than a Son. They believe that Paradise is located in the Heavens directly above the place where she lived while she was in the world, and that those who venerate her and live a righteous life as she commanded would ultimately get to Paradise. By the end of the story it is revealed that humans on this world are descended from the crew of a crashed interstellar ship, the Daughter of God being evidently a mytholigized memory of the ship's captain or of a woman leader who rallied the survivors to adapt to living in their new environment.

Non-dominant Christianity
Harry Turtledove's Gunpowder Empire describes an alternate history in which the Roman Empire never fell and remained in existence until the 21st century and beyond. Constantine was never an emperor and Christianity never became the Empire's dominant religion, remaining a minority religion, one among many. For centuries Christianity had been brutally persecuted, because Christians were adamantly opposed to all other religions of the Empire, refusing to take part in any religious ceremony even when paying for such defiance with their lives. But after several centuries, a modus vivendi was achieved whereby those who became known as Imperial Christians agreed to make an offering of incense (rather than an animal sacrifice) and make this offering for "The Spirit of the Emperor" without recognizing the Emperor's divinity or referring to any other deity. An Imperial Christian moving to a new city was required by law to make such an offering, and had to pay for the handful of incense at the full price of a sacrificial animal. Officials harboring anti-Christian prejudice often provided Imperial Christians performing this duty with an inferior quality incense, to punish them for their insincerity. A more intransigent faction, calling themselves Hard Christians, refused to take part in such ceremonies and scorned the Imperial Christians for their willingness to compromise. The Imperial authorities did not actively persecute the Hard Christians, either, but such defiance could entail various disabilities in daily life. The difference between the two kinds of Christians often overlapped with class differences: The Imperial Christians tended to be well-to-do merchants and artisans, whose business interests required being on reasonably good terms with the authorities, while the Hard Christians were often from the lower classes, in many cases slaves or former slaves. For their part, the Imperial authorities persisted in regarding Jesus as one among the Empire's many gods, giving him a statue and a niche in official temples on an equal footing with the other deities. One artist came up with a mosaic which showed Jesus and Mithras as equal teammates in battle against a demon. Christians of all kinds resented this representation of Jesus, but were powerless to change it. In the rival Empire of Lietuva, Christianity was not tolerated, the Lietuvan authorities greatly resenting the Christians' refusal to recognize Perkunas and proclaiming him a "false god". Lietuva was known among Christians as "the place where one can still become a martyr," which made it somewhat attractive to certain Christians. Crosstime travelers who visited this Rome and studied its culture became interested in the differences between the Bible used by its Christians and the Bible in this universe. For example, in the Bible used by Christians in the surviving Roman Empire there were only three Gospels, as the Book of John had never been written (and John the Apostle himself possibly never born); the Acts of the Apostles had the same name, but recorded quite different acts; and the Epistles of Paul included several addressed to churches in locations to which the Paul the Apostle never wrote in the history of the Home Timeline. St. Jerome was never born in this alternate, so someone else had translated the Bible into Latin. Such differences provided scholars in the Home Timeline with material to embark on the new field of Comparative Crosstime Bible Studies.

Judaism

 In Philip Jose Farmer's 1952 novella The Lovers (expanded into a novel in 1961 & '79) the religion of the Haijac Union derives from Isaac Sigman, a messianic figure of a thousand years prior to the events of the story. Sigmanism is the belief system of the "Sturch" (state-church) and it is clear that it is an elaboration, or variant, of Judaism. It incorporates the "Serialism" of J.W. Dunne under an extremely oppressive and coersive theocracy. 
 I, Gezheh by Clifford Meth, presents a futuristic universe where the Hasidic sect Chabad-Lubavitch have gained influence over many alien worlds
 Philip Jose Farmer's 1979 novel Jesus on Mars has terran marsnauts discover a civilization on Mars composed of the technologically superior Krsh and a population of human beings descended from people picked up from earth centuries before. The Krsh and humans now form one community who practice a form of Judaism, having been converted by Matthias, the disciple who replaced Judas as one of the original Twelve. They acknowledge Jesus Christ as the Messiah, God's adopted Son, but not as deity, causing all sorts of issues for the terran crew (which comprises a nominal Baptist, a liberal Jew and Muslim, and an atheist) who come face to face with a figure claiming to be Christ himself.
 In the Harry Turtledove novel Alpha and Omega, archaeologists discover the Ark of the Covenant under the Temple Mount, while at the same time a red heifer is procured, paving the way for the building of the Third Temple and the arrival of the Messiah.
 The Harry Turtledove short story "The R-Strain" (1985) is about a genetically engineered ruminant pig, and the debate over whether or not it would be kosher.

Logos

 VALIS (1981) by Philip K. Dick

Messianism

 In Frank Herbert's Dune, Paul Muad'dib becomes a prophetic messiah to the Fremen when his mental training and the drug/spice melange allow him to directly perceive time and space
 In Stranger in a Strange Land, by Robert A. Heinlein, Valentine Michael Smith becomes a messiah figure to some of the general population of the earth, when having been raised by Martians, he turns their philosophy into a human religion
 When the Sleeper Wakes, by H. G. Wells
 Arthur C. Clarke's The City and the Stars C. S. Lewis, The Space Trilogy series of novels, in the course which the Cambridge lecturer Erwin Ransom develops into a kind of Prophet or Saint.
 Gene Wolfe, The Book of the New Sun John Barnes' The Sky So Big and Black He Walked Among Us, Weird Science #13—A spaceman on a four-year expedition uses his technology to help the locals—curing a boy with antibiotics, using dehydrated pills to turn water into milk, creating at the spaceman had been executed on a rack, becoming the planet's religious symbol and the "son" of their god.
 Superman is viewed as the superhero equivalent of Jesus, especially in the 1978 film series, Smallville and the DC Extended Universe. Batman v Superman: Dawn of Justice seems to highlight that concept in some respects, with the odd biblical allusion.

Millennialism and Millenarianism

 Childhood's End (1953) by Arthur C. Clarke
 Lord of the World (1907) by Robert Hugh Benson

 In the short story "The Word to Space" by Poul Anderson, alien religious broadcasts were deliberately beamed to humanity.

Original sin

 A Case of Conscience, by James Blish, is the story of a Jesuit who investigates an alien race which evolves through several forms through the course of its life cycle and which has no religion, any concept of God, an afterlife, or the idea of sin
 In Perelandra, by C. S. Lewis, the protagonist must stop a second Fall of Man from happening on another planet
 The Golden Compass by Philip Pullman, revolves around the idea of original sin through the mention of Dust

Pope

 In In partibus infidelium ("In the Land of the Unbelievers") by Polish writer Jacek Dukaj, humanity makes contact with other space-faring civilizations, and Christianity—specifically, the Catholic Church—spreads far and wide until eventually humans become a minority among believers and an alien is elected as Pope.
 In Project Pope, by Clifford Simak, robots on the planet End of Nowhere have labored a thousand years to build a computerized, infallible pope to eke out the ultimate truth, have their work preempted when a human Listener discovers what might be the planet Heaven
 In Robert Silverberg's short story Good News from the Vatican a robot is elected to the position of Pope of the Catholic Church.
 In Star Trek: Deep Space Nine, the Kai is a singular person elected by monks (Vedeks) to become the leader of the Bajoran religion and is an allegorical Pope. Although the Kai does not rule the planet Bajor, the Kai does act as an Ambassador for the entire planet and can make large political decisions on top of being the religious leader of the planet.

Penance

 A Canticle for Leibowitz, by Walter M. Miller Jr.
 The Patterns of Chaos (1972) by Colin Kapp
 Redemption Ark, by Alastair Reynolds

Reincarnation

 The Takeshi Kovacs trilogy (2002, 2003, 2005) by Richard K. Morgan - In the novel's somewhat dystopian world, human personalities can be stored digitally and downloaded into new bodies, called sleeves. Most people have cortical stacks in their spinal columns that store their memories. If their body dies, their stack can be stored indefinitely. Catholics have arranged that they will not be resleeved as they believe that the soul goes to Heaven when they die, and so would not pass on to the new sleeve.
 Born with the Dead, (1974) by Robert Silverberg
 Lumen, (1864) by Camille Flammarion
 The Helliconia Trilogy, by Brian W. Aldiss
 Immortality, Inc., (1959) by Robert Sheckley
 Life, the Universe, and Everything, by Douglas Adams, features an unfortunate creature named Agrajag who has reincarnated hundreds—maybe thousands—of times over, each time being accidentally killed by Arthur Dent
 Lord of Light (1967) by Roger Zelazny
 Neon Lotus (1988) by Marc Laidlaw
 Ubik (1969) by Philip K. Dick — In the novel, companies uses a form of cryonic suspension to preserve the deceased in a state of "half-life" which allows for limited consciousness and the ability to communicate. Ella Hyde Runciter, who has been in "half-life" for many years, tells protagonist Joe Chip that she's in the process of leaving it for reincarnation ("Fairly soon, I'll be reborn into another womb, I think" (p. 217)). To her husband, Glen Runciter, she describes this rebirth as beginning by a dissolution of personality, an intermingling and "growing together" of different personalities in half-life, and tells him that she keeps dreaming of a "smoky red light." He reminds her that the Bardo Thödol (Tibetan Book of the Dead) indicates that the smoky red light is a "bad womb"—a "humiliating, low sort of womb"—and to be avoided (pp. 12–13).
 The Vitanuls (1967) by John Brunner extrapolates the implications of a Hindu cosmology of rebirth in a world that has conquered death.

Star of Bethlehem

 In The Star by Arthur C. Clarke (1955), a Jesuit serving as the astrophysicist of an interstellar exploration ship suffers a deep crisis of faith upon discovering that the star seen on Earth at 4 BC was actually a supernova which destroyed an entire sentient and highly developed race—in Christian religious perspective, God had utterly destroyed these peaceful and virtuous beings in order to announce to humanity the birth of His son

Theocracy
Depictions of a fictional society dominated by a theocracy are a recurring theme in science fiction. Such depictions are mostly dystopian, in some cases humorous or satirical and rarely positive.

 In Philip Jose Farmer's 1952 novella The Lovers (expanded into a novel in 1961 & '79) the religion of the Haijac Union derives from Isaac Sigman, a messianic figure of a thousand years prior to the events of the story. Sigmanism is the belief system of the "Sturch" (state-church) and it is clear that it is an elaboration, or variant, of Judaism. It incorporates the "Serialism" of J.W. Dunne under an extremely oppressive and coersive theocracy
 The Accidental Time Machine (2007) by Joe Haldeman – The eastern United States is ruled by a theocracy which came into existence in which the Second Coming supposedly occurred, resulting in a One Year War.
 Gather, Darkness (1943) by Fritz Leiber – A dystopian and rather satirical depiction of a future theocracy and the revolution which brings it down. In it religion is powered by long-lost science; 'miracles' are performed by machines and computers and used to keep ignorant peasants frightened and in line.
 The Handmaid's Tale (1985) by Margaret Atwood – In the fundamentalist Christian theocracy "Republic of Gilead" in the post-apocalyptic ruins of the United States virtually every thought and action of the protagonist is strictly prescribed by the government.
 If This Goes On—/Revolt in 2100 (1940) by Robert A. Heinlein – The story is set in a future theocratic American society, ruled by the latest in a series of fundamentalist Christian "Prophets". It was revised and expanded for inclusion in the 1953 collection Revolt in 2100.
 The Last Starship from Earth (1968) by John Boyd – The novel is set in a dystopian society in the very near future in whose alternate history Jesus Christ became a revolutionary agitator and was never subjected to crucifixion. He assembled an army to overthrow the Roman Empire, and established a theocracy that has lasted until the twentieth century. He was killed by a crossbow while entering Rome, so the crossbow becomes a religious symbol similar to the cross in our timeline.
 Run, Come See Jerusalem! (1976) by Richard C. Meredith – An alternate United States defeats a Nazi Germany which came much closer to world domination than in our history, but in the aftermath falls under the power of a ruthless home-grown "Prophet".
 The Stork Factor (1975) by Zach Hughes - A repressive religious dictatorship rules a stratified, opiated society in America where no man may advance himself except through religious hypocrisy. Suddenly a young priest, sincere in his religion, finds himself the power of spontaneous healing, a power of overwhelming political import in a society whose medical care is reserved for citizens of high status. He is rescued by the underground after fleeing the police, and while trying to develop and control his unique talent, he inadvertently encounters a survivor of a decadent alien civilization and finds his power increased enormously.
 Candle/The Sky So Big and Black (2000, 2003) by John Barnes
 The Long Tomorrow (1955) by Leigh Brackett – set in the aftermath of a nuclear war, it portrays a world where scientific knowledge is feared and restricted.
 The Chrysalids (1955) by John Wyndham – the novel features an agrarian theocracy, "Waknuk".
 The John Grimes novels (1950s and 1960s) by A. Bertram Chandler include a positively depicted theocracy. On the world "Tharn", the progressive priesthood of a religion resembling Buddhism actively promotes science and technology and confronts a cabal of reactionary robber barons.
 The Ballad of Beta-2 (1965) by Samuel R. Delany includes a fanatic and oppressive theocracy growing up on generation ships engaged on a long interstellar voyage, causing the failure of their mission.
 The world of the Dune series (1965–present) by Frank Herbert is a feudal theocracy.
 In Lord of Light (1967) by Roger Zelazny a spaceshipload of humans set themselves up as gods and rulers of an alien race and their offspring.
 Noninterference (1987) by Harry Turtledove – An illegal interference by Earth agents with a humanoid alien race inadvertently turns a local woman into an immortal, and she eventually becomes the revered Goddess of a planet-wide religion - but all is well, since she is a highly benevolent and good-hearted person who makes only a positive use of her complete religious and secular power.
 The Shield of Time (1990) by Poul Anderson – An alternate 20th century Europe under total control of the Catholic Church, with all dissent immediately crushed by the Inquisition. All European monarchies were abolished and replaced by the rule of "Arch-Cardinals", each of whom wields total secular and religious power in one or several countries (the one in Paris rules also over England). 
 Voyagers VI - The Return (2009) by Ben Bova – Keith Stoner returns to Earth after more than a century of exploring the stars and faces a changed world that is suffering the consequences of disastrous greenhouse flooding. Most nations have been taken over by ultraconservative religion-based governments, such as the "New Morality" in the United States.
 The biopunk/steampunk video game BioShock Infinite (2013) – In the floating city of Columbia, Zachary Hale Comstock leads a single-party theocratic dictatorship based on the Founding Fathers of the United States and himself under title as "Prophet of Columbia" and later Her "Daughter" Elizabeth as "Lamb of Columbia".
 The totalitarian system portrayed in Nineteen Eighty-Four (1949) by George Orwell in many ways equals a theocracy. In the society of the novel Big Brother is always watching everyone, is said to be controlling society and is worshipped by its members. Furthermore, the party's secret slogan is "God is Power". An intended relationship to the concept of a theocracy is highlighted in Orwell's essay "The Prevention of Literature" in which he states that "a totalitarian state is in effect a theocracy, and its ruling caste, in order to keep its position, has to be thought of as infallible. But since, in practice, no one is infallible, it is frequently necessary to rearrange past events in order to show that this or that mistake was not made, or that this or that imaginary triumph actually happened. Then, again, every major change in policy demands a corresponding change of doctrine and a revaluation of prominent historical figures".
 The Parafaith War (1996) by L. E. Modesitt Jr. is set in a future where humanity has spread to the stars and divided into several factions. Two factions, the "Eco-Tech Coalition" and the "Revenants of the Prophet" are engaged in a futile war over territory and their competing social philosophies. The ecologically aware Coalition must hold back the zealous "rev" hordes constantly seeking new territory for their ever-expanding theocratic society.
 In Robert Merle's novel Malevil (1972), nuclear war devastated the world with an agrarian society slowly starting to reform thereafter. One of the main challenges of this new society is to fend off the threat of a new theocratic dictatorship that has taken over a neighboring village of the rationalistic community of Malevil castle, which in turn has to begin research into the reinvention of weapons.
 In The Fifth Sacred Thing (1993) by Starhawk, residents of a post-apocalyptic San Francisco live in a utopian sustainable economy which is threatened by an ecologically devastated, violent and overtly theocratic Christian fundamentalist Los Angeles that plans to wage war against the San Franciscans. The novel explores the events before and during the ensuing struggle between the two nations, pitting utopia and dystopia against each other.
 In Warhammer 40k novels and setting lore for the game Cardinal worlds are run entirely by localized theocracy under the Eclesiarchy (the official religion of the Imperium of Man).
 Planet of the Apes features a theocracy of talking apes that follows the teachings of the "Sacred Scrolls" that their God created apes in their own image and that they were granted dominion over "beasts" such as humans. As such, any attempt to question these teachings is met with charges of heresy.

See also
 List of religious ideas in fantasy fiction
 Religious debates over the Harry Potter series
 List of fictional religions
 Voices (Le Guin novel)#Religion
 Barsoom#Religious deception

References

Further reading
 Clark, S. 2005. "Science Fiction and Religion." In Seed, D., ed. A Companion to Science Fiction. Malden, Mass.: Blackwell Publishing, p. 95-110. 
 Cowan, D. 2010. Sacred Space: the Quest for Transcendence in Science Fiction Film and Television, Waco, Tex.: Baylor University Press. 
 McGrath, J., ed. 2012. Religion and Science Fiction.  Eugene, Or.: Pickwick Publications. 
 Mckee, G. 2007. The Gospel According to Science Fiction: From the Twilight Zone to the Final Frontier. Louisville: Westminster John Knox Press. 
 Riley, R. 1985. The Transcendent Adventure: Studies of Religion in Science Fiction Fantasy''. Westport, Conn.: Greenwood Press.

External links
 The Encyclopedia of Science Fiction: Religion
 Science Fiction featuring various specific religions, adherents.com.
 Jewish Chassidic Sci-Fi, chabad.org
 Annotated Bibliography covering Catholicism in Science Fiction, thecatholicwiki.com
 Sci-fi and God - An enhanced episode guide covering and discussing science fiction from a Christian perspective.

Science fiction lists
Science fiction themes
Science Fiction